Zhang Zhijun (born February 1946) is a Chinese diplomat who served as Chinese Ambassador to the United Arab Emirates from 2001 to 2006.

Early life and education
Zhang was born in Beizhen County (now Beizhen), Liaoning, in February 1946, and graduated from Beijing International Studies University.

Career
Zhang joined the Foreign Service in 1971. In 2001 he succeeded  as Chinese Ambassador to the United Arab Emirates, serving in that position from 2001 to 2006.

Awards
 9 October 2006 Medal of Independence (First Class)

References

1946 births
Living people
People from Beizhen
Beijing International Studies University alumni
Ambassadors of China to the United Arab Emirates